Kunzea acicularis is a flowering plant in the myrtle family, Myrtaceae and is endemic to the south-west of Western Australia. It is a shrub with a few erect stems, small and groups of three to five, pink to mauve flowers. It is a rare, recently described species only known from a small area near Ravensthorpe.

Description

Three to five pink to mauve flowers are arranged in groups on the ends of branches. Flowering occurs in October and November and is followed by fruit which are hairy urn-shaped capsules with the sepals attached.

Taxonomy and naming
This species was first formally described in 2007 by Hellmut Toelken and Gil Craig and the description was published in Nuytsia. The specific epithet (acicularis) is a Latin word meaning "like a needle" referring to the needle-like bracts.

Distribution and habitat
This kunzea grows in mallee and heath on hills and slopes north-east of Ravensthorpe in the Esperance Plains biogeographic region.

Conservation
Kunzea acicularis is classified as "Threatened Flora (Declared Rare Flora — Extant)" by the Western Australian Government Department of Parks and Wildlife and an interim recovery plan has been prepared.

References

acicularis
Endemic flora of Western Australia
Critically endangered flora of Australia
Myrtales of Australia
Rosids of Western Australia
Plants described in 2007
Taxa named by Hellmut R. Toelken